Godesberger Bach (also Arzdorfer Bach) is a river in Wachtberg and Bonn, in North Rhine-Westphalia, Germany. It is a left tributary of the Rhine in Bad Godesberg.

See also
List of rivers of North Rhine-Westphalia

References

Rivers of North Rhine-Westphalia
Rivers of Germany